The Kanchamatia River is a river in Ishwarganj and Nandail upazilas of Mymensingh district in northeastern Bangladesh. It is a tributary of the Old Brahmaputra Rivar and is the only river passing through these upazilas.

Reference

Distributaries of the Ganges
Rivers of Bangladesh
Mymensingh District
Rivers of Mymensingh Division